WMS-2539 is a fluorinated derivative of dexoxadrol and a potent uncompetitive NMDA receptor antagonist.

External links
 Synthesis and SAR studies of chiral non-racemic dexoxadrol analogues as uncompetitive NMDA receptor antagonists

Piperidines
Dioxolanes
Organofluorides